USR PLUS was a Romanian progressive, liberal, and centrist political alliance active between 2019 and 2021. Established on 2 February 2019 solely as an electoral alliance between the political parties Save Romania Union (USR) and the Freedom, Unity and Solidarity Party (PLUS) it was initially called 2020 USR-PLUS Alliance. The alliance was formed to participate together in the May 2019 European Parliament election in Romania.

Subsequently, the two parties decided to sign a protocol for a political alliance for the 2019 Romanian presidential election and for the 2020 local and legislative elections as well.

The alliance was dissolved when the two parties formally merged after a successful vote during an online congress on 15 August 2020 and the approval of this event by the Court of Appeal of Bucharest on 16 April 2021. Furthermore, the party celebrated in early October 2021 a new congress where Dacian Cioloș was elected to be the sole president of the party. In the same congress, the 24 members of the party's National Political Bureau were elected and the congress voted to conserve Save Romania Union as the statutory name of the party, setting aside provisions in the merger protocol recommending that the name be changed to USR PLUS.

History

Dan Barna (USR) and Dacian Cioloș (PLUS), as leaders of the alliance, declared on 2 February 2019 that the two parties reached an agreement to participate jointly in European elections and that the project was a first step towards a possible success in the 2020 Romanian legislative election.

On 7 March 2019, the Central Electoral Bureau (BEC) rejected the application for registration of the 2020 USR-PLUS Alliance for the European Parliament elections, motivating that Barna and Cioloș were not listed as presidents of the two parties in the Register of Political Parties. Barna was elected president of the USR in October 2017, and Cioloș was elected president of the PLUS in February 2019. Both requested their registration as presidents at the Bucharest Tribunal, but until the Alliance's registration they did not receive a final decision. Deputy Nicușor Dan, former president of the USR, declared that "I found, together with the legal team, the solution that would allow me to legally countersign the protocol of the USR-PLUS Alliance". On March 8, the High Court of Cassation and Justice accepted USR-PLUS' appeal to the decision of the BEC to not to allow the alliance to be registered. The alliance's chosen slogan used to be Fără hoție ajungem departe, meaning "Without thievery we go far" and referring to the existing corruption in Romania. Nowadays, the slogan is O Românie fără hoție ("A Romania without thievery").

On 15 August 2020, members of the USR and PLUS held an online congress to decide whether to formally unite the two parties or not, with 84.65% of the participants voting in favor of a merger. This new party would still be called USR (Save Romania Union) and would be led by Barna and Cioloș until a judicial decision on the merger was made; then, the party would be renamed to "USR PLUS".

The parties, USR and PLUS, officially and legally merged into one single party on 16 April 2021 after the approval of this by the Court of Appeal of Bucharest. In addition, the party was said to be preparing for a new congress, probably held in the autumn of 2021, to vote a single leadership, with Barna and Cioloș announcing that they would both participate in this vote.

In early October 2021, Dacian Cioloș was elected president of the party in the congress. Subsequently, the 24 members of the National Political Bureau were elected, while it was decided that the statutory name of the party remains Save Romania Union.

2019 European Parliament elections

On 4 April 2019, the 2020 USR-PLUS Alliance presented, during a press conference, its party platform for the European Parliament elections. The alliance's electoral offer covers four main subjects: "Justice and protection of the rights of the Romanians in the European Union", "welfare for society: health, education and anti-poverty measures", "European prosperity at home, in Romania", and "foreign and secure policy". Among the promises of the alliance are the creation of an applicable European Mechanism for Cooperation and Verification, Romania's accession to the Schengen Area and changes in education, agriculture and infrastructure. The alliance also supports the Accession of Moldova to the European Union.

On the occasion of the European Council meeting of May 9 in Sibiu, Romania, Ciolos had a meeting with Emmanuel Macron, President of France, focused on a discussion on the creation of a new political group in the European Parliament after the elections of May 26.

During the political campaign, the alliance organized two major party rallies attended by both leaders of the alliance, one on May 5 in Cluj-Napoca and the other one on May 12 in Timișoara. The Bucharest rally of 24 May was also attended by Guy Verhofstadt, leader of the ALDE Group in the European Parliament, who announced the formation of a new Pro-European reformist center parliamentary group, together with the La République En Marche! of Emmanuel Macron.

Electoral history

Legislative elections

 Notes
1

Local elections

Presidential elections

European Parliament elections

See also
 Politics of Romania

References

External links

 

2019 establishments in Romania
2021 disestablishments in Romania
Centrist parties in Romania
Political parties established in 2019
Political parties disestablished in 2021
Defunct political party alliances in Romania
Pro-European political parties in Romania
Registered political parties in Romania